Canada's Senior Women's National Softball Team represents Canada in international softball. They are overseen by Softball Canada, the governing body of softball in Canada.

They are one of the top-ranked softball teams in the world. The team represents Canada at international competitions such as the ISF World Championship, World Cup and Pan-Am Games events and competed at the Summer Olympic Games since the sport was inaugurated at the 1996 Summer Olympics in Atlanta. The team won bronze at the 2020 Summer Olympics, in Tokyo; this was the fifth Olympics to include softball (no softball in 2012 nor 2016). The team won gold at the 1983 Pan American Games in Caracas and the 2015 Pan American Games in Toronto. The team won bronze at the 2018 World Championship.

Team

References
 Canada Senior Women's National Team
 Canadian Olympic Committee
 The Sports Network
 The Star – Beijing Olympics 2008
 CBC Olympics

External links
International Softball Federation

Canada women's national softball team
Women's national softball teams
Soft
Softball in Canada